Torbjörn Blomqvist (February 14, 1941 – February 20, 2017) was a Finnish sprint canoer, who competed in the early 1960s. He was born in Helsinki. He was eliminated in the semifinals of the K-1 4 × 500 m event at the 1960 Summer Olympics in Rome.

References
Torbjörn Blomqvist's profile at Sports Reference.com
Torbjörn Blomqvist's obituary 

1941 births
2017 deaths
Sportspeople from Helsinki
Canoeists at the 1960 Summer Olympics
Finnish male canoeists
Olympic canoeists of Finland